Antun Marković (born 4 July 1992) is a Croatian footballer who plays as a goalkeeper for Croatian club Slaven Belupo.

Club career

Atyrau
On 19 July 2019, Marković joined Kazakhstan Premier League side Atyrau. Two days later, he made his debut in a 1–0 home win against Ordabasy after being named in the starting line-up.

Return to Slaven Belupo 
On 30 June 2020, Marković signed a one-month contract with Croatian First League club Slaven Belupo. His return came after the resumption of league matches which remained in half due to the COVID-19 pandemic, but he failed to debut with the team as it was the third choice.

Papuk Orahovica
On 21 August 2020, Marković joined Croatian Third League side Papuk Orahovica. Eight days later, he made his debut in a 1–1 away draw against Tehničar after being named in the starting line-up.

Rot-Weiß Erfurt
On 1 February 2021, Marković joined with NOFV-Oberliga Süd club Rot-Weiß Erfurt after signed a short-term deal until the end of the 2021–22 season.

Second return to Slaven Belupo
On 9 July 2021, Marković signed a two-year contract with Croatian First League club Slaven Belupo. Seven days later, he was named as a first team substitute for the first time in a league match against Dinamo Zagreb. His debut with Slaven Belupo came on 20 May 2022 in a 3–1 away defeat against Istra 1961 after being named in the starting line-up.

International career
Marković was born in Gjilan, FR Yugoslavia and raised in Voćin, Croatia to Kosovo Croats parents. On 22 May 2017, he received a call-up from Croatia for the friendly match against Mexico, he was an unused substitute in that match. In addition to Croatia, he has the right to represent his homeland, Kosovo at the international level.

Career statistics

Club

References

External links

1992 births
Living people
People from Gjilan
Kosovo Croats
Association football goalkeepers
Croatian footballers
Kosovan footballers
NK Slaven Belupo players
NK Koprivnica players
FC Atyrau players
FC Rot-Weiß Erfurt players
Croatian Football League players
Second Football League (Croatia) players
Kazakhstan Premier League players
Oberliga (football) players
Kosovan expatriate footballers
Croatian expatriate footballers
Expatriate footballers in Kazakhstan
Croatian expatriate sportspeople in Kazakhstan
Expatriate footballers in Germany
Croatian expatriate sportspeople in Germany
Kosovan expatriate sportspeople in Croatia
Kosovan expatriate sportspeople in Kazakhstan
Kosovan expatriate sportspeople in Germany